Patrick James may refer to:

Patrick James (professor) (born 1957), professor of international relations 
Patrick James (singer), Irish singer, winner of series 4 of The Voice of Ireland

See also
 
James Patrick (disambiguation)